G-Spot is a Canadian adult comedy television series. The show debuted on The Movie Network and Movie Central on April 25, 2005 and ran for two seasons until April 3, 2006, and is also seen on the Showcase and E! network. The show is executive produced by, written by and stars Brigitte Bako. A third season began airing in 2009 with eight new episodes.

Cast 
 Brigitte Bako as Gigi
 Heather Hanson as Stella
 Kimberly Huie as Roxy
 Ian Alden as Rick
 Hannah Lochner as Sasha
 Sebastian Spence as Paul
 Kristin Lehman as Francesca (Season 1)
 Stephanie Moore as Livia (Seasons 2–3)

Guest stars
Michael T. Weiss
Scott Thompson

Main crew
Michael Kennedy
Steve DiMarco   (four episodes, 2005)
David Wu   (four episodes, 2005)
Shawn Thompson   (two episodes, 2006)
Brigitte Bako   (14 episodes, 2005–2006)
Michael Short   (five episodes, 2006)
Alex Pugsley
Johanna Stein

International broadcasters

External links 

 The Movie Network page
 Showcase Network page
 
  G-Spot Season Three Article; Sugarcain Entertainment.com

Showcase (Canadian TV channel) original programming
Television series by Entertainment One
Crave original programming
2000s Canadian sitcoms
2005 Canadian television series debuts
2009 Canadian television series endings